Rubin is both a surname and a given name. Rubins is a Latvian-language name.It derives from the biblical name Reuben as a Jewish name.The choice is also influenced by the word rubin meaning "ruby," is some languages.

Notable people with the name include:

Given name
Rubin Carter, nicknamed "The Hurricane," was a boxer who was imprisoned and later absolved.
Rubin Goldmark
Rubin Kantorovich
Rubin Patiția

Surname
Alan Rubin, American musician
Albert Rubin (1887–1956), Jewish painter
Andrejs Rubins (born 1978), Latvian footballer.
Andy Rubin, senior vice president of Mobile at Google
Arthur Rubin (born 1956), American mathematician
Avi Rubin, expert on electronic voting security
Barbara Rubin (1945–1980), American filmmaker and performance artist
Benjamin Rubin (1917–2010), American microbiologist
Bruce Joel Rubin (born 1943), Oscar-winning screenwriter.
Carol Rubin (1945–2001), American film producer
Chanda Rubin (born 1976), American professional tennis player.
Charles T. Rubin, political science professor
[[Danny Rubin (basketball) (born 1991), an American-Israeli basketball player
Daphne Rubin-Vega (born 1969), American dance music singer and actress.
Dave Rubin (born 1976), American comedian, talk show host and television personality
Donald Rubin, Professor of Statistics
Donna Rubin (born 1959), American tennis player
Eduard Rubin, Swiss Army, inventor of the first jacketed rifle bullets (1882) and co-inventor of the Schmidt–Rubin rifle
Edgar John Rubin (1886–1951)
Enriqueta González Rubín (1832–1877), Spanish writer and journalist
Eric J. Rubin, Irene Heinz Given Professor of Immunology and Infectious Diseases at Harvard T.H. Chan School of Public Health
Eric S. Rubin (born 1961), American diplomat and ambassador
Erik Rubin (born 1971), Mexican singer and actor.
Gayle Rubin (born 1949), American cultural anthropologist
Gerald M. Rubin, American geneticist
Gretchen Rubin (born 1965), American author and attorney.
Harold Rubin, South African and Israeli artist and jazz clarinetist.
Harry Rubin (virologist) (1926–2020), American virologist and cancer researcher
Harry M. Rubin (born 1952), American business executive
Ian Rubin, Ukraine-born Australian rugby league footballer
Idan Rubin, Israeli football (soccer) player
Ira Rubin (c. 1930–2013), American bridge player
Irv Rubin (1946–2002), Canadian-born Kahanist
Isaak Illich Rubin (1886–1937), Soviet economist and Marxist theorist.
James Rubin (born 1960), U.S. Assistant Secretary of State for Public Affairs, 1997–2000
James H. Rubin, art historian, New York City
Jay Rubin
Jean E. Rubin (1926–2002), American mathematician
Jennifer Rubin (actress), American film and television actress.
Jennifer Rubin (journalist), blogger at The Washington Post
Jerry Rubin, American political activist
Karl Rubin, American mathematician
Kathleen Rubins (born 1978), American microbiologist and NASA astronaut.
Lillian B. Rubin (1924–2014), American sociologist and writer
Lisa Rubin (born 1977), Canadian theatre director.
Louis D. Rubin, Jr. (1923–2013), Southern literature scholar and publisher
Marcel Rubin (1905–1995), Austrian composer
Meyer Rubin (1924–2020), American geologist
Michael Rubin, American scholar and commentator on Middle Eastern history and politics
Miri Rubin, British medievalist
Noah Rubin (born 1996), American tennis player
Philip Rubin (born 1949), American cognitive scientist, technologist, and science administrator
Reuven Rubin (1893–1974), Israeli painter
Richard Rubin (TV personality), American TV personality.
Rick Rubin, American record producer and record label owner,
Ron Rubin (disambiguation)
Robert Rubin (born 1938), U.S. Treasury Secretary, 1995–1999
Sabine Rubin (born 1960), a French politician
Samuel M. Rubin ("Sam the Popcorn Man", 1918–2004), an American entrepreneur credited with the mass introduction of popcorn machines to cinemas
Shelley Rubin, chairman and CEO of the Jewish Defense League
Sherry Rubin, born Sherry Arnstein (1930–1997), was an American public servant, author of influential papers in participatory decision making
Theodore Isaac Rubin (1923–2019), American psychiatrist and author
Tibor Rubin, Hungarian-American
Uri Rubin, professor of Arabic and Islamic literature at Tel Aviv University
Vera Rubin (1928–2016), American astronomer
Yoram Rubin, bodyguard of Israeli prime minister Yitzhak Rabin

See also
Reuben (disambiguation)
Rubini
Rubino
Rubin Design Bureau

References

Surnames
Jewish surnames